Sepulveda Boulevard is a major street and transportation corridor in the City of Los Angeles and several other cities in western Los Angeles County, California. The street parallels Interstate 405 for much of its route. Portions of Sepulveda Boulevard between Manhattan Beach and Los Angeles International Airport (LAX) are designated as part of State Route 1 (SR 1).

Since 2018, there have actually been four distinct segments in Los Angeles County signed as Sepulveda Boulevard. The southernmost of the four segments is an east-west route located in the South Bay, and continues west as Camino Real in Torrance and east as Willow Street in Long Beach. The second segment runs from Manhattan Beach north to the southern border of El Segundo. The third segment runs from LAX, through the Westside regions, and over the Santa Monica Mountains at the Sepulveda Pass into the San Fernando Valley. The northernmost section of Sepulveda Boulevard is in Sylmar, running from Roxford Street north to San Fernando Road.

The City of El Segundo has since renamed their portion of SR 1 to Pacific Coast Highway.

History
In 1769, the Spanish Portola expedition, the first Europeans to see inland areas of California, traveled north through Sepulveda pass on August 5. The party had been travelling west, intending to reach and follow the coast, but were discouraged by the steep coastal cliffs beginning at today's Pacific Palisades and decided to detour inland. They found the pass through the Santa Monica Mountains and followed it into the San Fernando Valley. The pass had originally been a faint footpath used by the native Tongva people.

Sepulveda Boulevard was named in 1925 after 19th century cattle rancher Francisco Xavier de Sepúlveda whose ranch, Rancho San Vicente y Santa Monica, extended from the route to the Pacific Ocean. 

 

Between the City of Hermosa Beach and Lincoln Boulevard, the road was once signed as U.S. Route 101 Alternate until being replaced by State Route 1; and between Lincoln Boulevard and San Fernando Road (formerly US 99), the road was once signed as State Route 7 until being replaced by Interstate 405. 

The part of the route that runs through the San Fernando Valley was a major hub of prostitution. The entertainment industry has also referenced the street. The 1931 comedy film Everything's Rosie has a chase scene that goes through the newly built Sepulveda Blvd tunnel. In 1946, Jay Livingston & Ray Evans wrote "SEPULVEDA" in tribute to the street. "SEPULVEDA" was recorded by Alvino Rey and his Orchestra with Joanne Ryan, Capitol Records, 262 and The King's Jesters, Vogue Records, 766. Sepulveda Boulevard, along with Pico Boulevard, is mentioned in the title and lyrics of a novelty song Pico and Sepulveda composed by Eddie Maxwell (Eddie Cherkose) and Jule Styne. The song was recorded by Freddy Martin and his orchestra in 1947 for a release as a single.

Name changes
Portions of Sepulveda Boulevard have had the name changed, especially most of those segments that were designated by state officials as part of State Route 1. Hermosa Beach historian John Hales said that the city formally adopted the name of Pacific Coast Highway in 1947 to possibly end a dispute to whether to name the route Sepulveda or Camino Real. In 2018 the city of El Segundo also decided to formally change the name to Pacific Coast Highway to better appeal to visitors as being a coastal community.

Route description

Since 2018, there are four distinct segments in Los Angeles County signed as Sepulveda Boulevard. 

The southernmost segment is an east-west route located in the South Bay area that continues east as Willow Street near SR 103 in Long Beach, and west as Camino Real before Torrance Boulevard in Torrance. It crosses the Harbor Freeway (I-110) in West Carson.

Sepulveda Boulevard then resumes at Artesia Boulevard in Manhattan Beach as a continuation of SR 1. In 2018, the city of El Segundo renamed their portion of SR 1 to Pacific Coast Highway from Rosecrans Avenue to Imperial Highway where SR 1 continues again as Sepulveda Boulevard. Past Imperial Highway, it crosses the western terminus of the Century Freeway (I-105), going through the LAX Airport Tunnel to pass under its runways. The road then passes through an interchange with Century Boulevard, which provides access to LAX's terminals to the west and the San Diego Freeway (I-405) to the east.

At the north end of LAX, SR 1 branches to the west as Lincoln Boulevard while Sepulveda Boulevard continues north to become a primary thoroughfare through the Westside region cities and communities of Westchester, Culver City, West Los Angeles, and Westwood. In Culver City, north of Slauson Avenue, it merges for a few blocks with Jefferson Boulevard. From Jefferson, Sepulveda Boulevard runs parallel to I-405 as it goes through West Los Angeles and Westwood, passing the Los Angeles National Cemetery.

After going past Bel Air, it parallels the freeway up the Sepulveda Canyon. At the Skirball Cultural Center, Sepulveda Boulevard then curves west away from I-405, passes through a tunnel under Mulholland Drive, and then follows a serpentine route down the north side of the Sepulveda Pass. It then passes under I-405 just before crossing Ventura Boulevard in Sherman Oaks. Sepulveda Boulevard then runs parallel to the east of I-405, crossing the Ventura Freeway (US 101) and the Los Angeles Metro G Line rapid transit route, and through the San Fernando Valley communities of Van Nuys and North Hills, to its northern terminus at the Rinaldi Street interchange with I-405 in Mission Hills.

The northernmost section of Sepulveda Boulevard is in Sylmar, running from Roxford Street to San Fernando Road, is primarily a frontage road along the Golden State Freeway (I-5). Prior to the construction of the 405 freeway in the 1960s, that disjunct piece and the main section of Sepulveda Boulevard were one continuous street, separated when the 405 freeway interchange with the Golden State Freeway was built atop the section between Rinaldi and Roxford Streets.

Public transportation

Public transit along Sepulveda Boulevard is provided by several different bus lines. The north-south part provides bus service in the San Fernando Valley by Metro Local line 234, through the Sepulveda Pass by Metro Rapid line 761, through West Los Angeles, Culver City and LAX by Culver City Transit Line 6 and Rapid 6, and from LAX onwards by Metro Local line 232. The west-east portion of Sepulveda Boulevard provides bus service by Torrance Transit line 7. Metro Rail has a station at Exposition Blvd on the E Line while Metro Busway has a station of the same name on the G Line. The A Line has a station in Long Beach at Long Beach Blvd within Willow Street.

Major intersections

References

External links
Illustrated tour of Sepulveda Boulevard
Sepulveda Blvd tunnel under Mulholland history

 
Streets in Los Angeles
Streets in Los Angeles County, California
Streets in the San Fernando Valley
Los Angeles Harbor Region
San Fernando Valley
Santa Monica Mountains
South Bay, Los Angeles
Westside (Los Angeles County)
California State Route 1
Red-light districts in California